Kuseh Kandi (also Romanized as Kūseh Kandī; also known as Kūsaj) is a village in Qaleh Darrehsi Rural District, in the Central District of Maku County, West Azerbaijan Province, Iran. At the 2006 census, its population was 425, in 87 families.

References 

Populated places in Maku County